Wittering may refer to:

 Wittering, Cambridgeshire
 RAF Wittering, near the above 
 Wittering, West Sussex, also known as The Witterings, which is divided into:
 East Wittering
 West Wittering
 Wittering, a character in the 1958 drama Unman, Wittering and Zigo